Escuela de rateros ("School of Thieves") is a 1958 Mexican film. It was written by Luis Alcoriza, starring Pedro Infante in a dual role, and Yolanda Varela. It was directed by Rogelio A. González. It was Infante's last film. It also raises awareness about violence against women.

Cast

References

Bibliography

External links
 
 

1958 films
Mexican crime comedy films
1950s Spanish-language films
Films directed by Rogelio A. González
1950s Mexican films